Sztynort  is a village in the administrative district of Gmina Węgorzewo, within Węgorzewo County, Warmian-Masurian Voivodeship, in northern Poland, close to the border with the Kaliningrad Oblast of Russia.

Before 1945, the area was part of the German province of (East Prussia). The Palace was the property of the Lehndorff family since 1420 (by other sources since 1565) until the expulsion of Germans from Poland after the border changes of 1945. The current palace was built by Marie Eleonore von Lehndorff née von Dönhoff after an older building had been destroyed by Polish Tatars in the Second Northern War in 1656.

German Foreign minister Joachim von Ribbentrop used the palace throughout his sojourns at the nearby Wolfsschanze between 1941 and 1944. The last proprietor of the estate, Heinrich Count von Lehndorff, was executed by the Nazis for his participation in the plot against Hitler that failed with the faulty assassination attempt on 20 July 1944, at the nearby Wolfsschanze wartime military headquarters of the Nazi regime.

After 1945, the palace was occupied for several years by the Red Army. An agricultural cooperative moved in in 1950. In 2009, it could still be viewed only from the outside, the interior, neglected for more than half a century, having become badly degraded.

In November 2009, the ownership of the palace was transferred to the German-Polish Foundation for Cultural Maintenance and historic Preservation (Deutsch-Polnische Stiftung Kulturpflege und Denkmalschutz), and reconstruction of the ruins began in 2010.

The village has a population of 170.

Notable residents 

Heinrich Graf von Lehndorff-Steinort (1909-1944), resistance fighter (daughter/model)-Veruschka von Lehndorff

References

Villages in Węgorzewo County